The Pará River, also called Parauaú River, Jacaré Grande River, Marajó River Channel, Macacos River Channel, Santa Maria River Channel and Bocas Bay, is a watercourse and immense estuarine complex that functions as a canal between the rivers Amazon (Amazon delta), Tocantins, Campina Grande (or Portel Bay) and Marajó Bay, in addition to numerous other smaller rivers. It can also be considered a distributary channel of the Tocantins River.

It is located in the state of Pará, Brazil. It presents muddy and turbid waters, rich in sediments originating from its source rivers.

Belém, the state capital of Pará, is located near the south bank of the river.

Previously academic research has come to consider this watercourse as a distributary channel of the Amazon River. However, this statement is currently considered unlikely, since recent studies have shown the small contribution of the waters of the Amazon River to the formation of the Pará River, with a greater contribution from the Tocantins River.

See also
List of rivers of Pará

References

Rivers of Pará
Distributaries of the Amazon River